Jason Boyce is a retired professional American soccer forward who played professionally in Major League Soccer and the USL A-League. He has four children, Jayson, Melia, Grace and Samuel Boyce. He coaches youth soccer for Pateadores, Newport/Costa Mesa 04 and 03. As well as the Women's Varsity soccer coach at Costa Mesa High School.

Youth
While born in Hollywood, California, Boyce grew up in Newport Beach.  He graduated from Corona del Mar High School where he was a 1993 Parade Magazine High School All American soccer player. He was also a California state finalist in the long jump his senior year.  Boyce attended the University of Washington, playing on the men's soccer team from 1994 to 1997.  He was a 1997 Second Team All American.

Professional
On February 1, 1998, the Colorado Rapids selected Boyce in the second round (twenty-third overall) of the 1998 MLS College Draft.  In July 1998, the Rapids sent Boyce on loan to MLS Pro 40.  On August 14, 1998, the Rapids traded Boyce and Tyrone Marshall to the Miami Fusion in exchange for David Vaudreuil.  He played five league games and one playoff game with the Fusion, then another four league games during the 1999 season before being waived in June 1999.  He signed with the Orange County Zodiac of the USL A-League.  He remained with the team, renamed the Orange County Wave in 2000.  He broke his foot near the end of the 2000 season and sat out the 2001 season.  He returned to the University of Washington to finish his degree.  In June 2002, Boyce signed with the Seattle Sounders after the team was hit with several injuries.  In 2004, he signed with the Utah Blitzz for that team's last season. In 2005, he played for the Los Angeles Galaxy reserve team. Boyce played for Hollywood United in 2007 and 2008.  In 2010, he again played for the Galaxy reserve team.

In 2016, his amateur team, Outbreak FC qualified to play in the 2016 Lamar Hunt U.S. Open Cup and were drawn against Seattle Sounders U-23.

International
In 1994, Boyce played several games for the United States men's national under-20 soccer team.

References

External links
 

1975 births
Living people
American soccer players
Colorado Rapids players
Hollywood United players
Major League Soccer players
Miami Fusion players
Orange County Blue Star players
Seattle Sounders (1994–2008) players
LA Galaxy players
USL League Two players
Utah Blitzz players
Washington Huskies men's soccer players
Soccer players from California
United States men's under-20 international soccer players
MLS Pro-40 players
A-League (1995–2004) players
Colorado Rapids draft picks
Association football defenders